The 70th Troop Carrier Squadron is an inactive United States Air Force unit.  It was last assigned to the 433d Troop Carrier Group, based at Cleveland Municipal Airport, Ohio. It was inactivated on 3 October 1950.

History

World War II
Aerial transportation during World War II; airborne assault at Aparri, Luzon, 23 June 1945.

Reserve operations

Lineage
 Constituted as the 70th Troop Carrier Squadron on 22 January 1943
 Activated on 9 February 1943
 Inactivated on 15 January 1946
 Activated in the reserve on 3 August 1947
 Redesignated 70th Troop Carrier Squadron, Medium on 27 June 1949
 Inactivated on 3 October 1950

Assignments
 433d Troop Carrier Group, 9 February 1943 – 15 January 1946
 433d Troop Carrier Group, 3 August 1947 – 3 October 1950

Stations
 Florence Army Air Field, South Carolina, 9 February 1943
 Sedalia Army Air Field, Missouri, 19 March 1943
 Laurinburg-Maxton Army Air Base, North Carolina, g June 1943
 Baer Field, Indiana, 1–13 August 1943
 RAAF Base Townsville, Australia, 7 September 1943
 Jackson Airfield (7 Mile Drome), Port Moresby, New Guinea, 21 September 1943
 Nadzab Airfield Complex, New Guinea, 10 October 1943
 Hollandia Airfield Complex, Netherlands East Indies, c. 3 July 1944
 Mokmer Airfield, Biak Island, Netherlands East Indies, c. 20 October 1944
 Dulag Airfield, Leyte, Philippines, 28 February 1945
 Tanauan Airfield, Leyte, Philippines, 12 April 1945
 Clark Field, Luzon, Philippines, c. 29 June 1945
 North Field (Iwo Jima), Iwo Jima, 26 August 1945
 Ie Shima Airfield, Okinawa, Ryuku Islands, 15 September 1945
 Tachikawa Airfield, Japan, 30 September 1945 – 15 January 1946
 Cleveland Municipal Airport, Ohio, 27 June 1949 – 3 October 1950

Aircraft
 Douglas C-47 Skytrain, 1943–1944
 Curtiss C-46 Commando, 1944–1945

References

Notes
 Explanatory notes

 Citations

Bibliography

External links

070
Military units and formations in Ohio
070